This is a list of Japanese bicycle brands and manufacturers — as well as brands with models manufactured in Japan.

Japanese bicycle brands and manufacturers

3 Rensho
 Alps
 Amanda (Tokyo)
 American Eagle, later Nishiki (U.S. brand, manufactured by Kawamura Cycle)
 American Star
 Amuna (written "AMVNA", manufactured by Matsumoto Cycle, Sendai)
 A.N. Design Works (Core Japan, Tokyo)
 Apollo (a Canadian brand manufactured by Kuwahara, marketed by Fred Deeley Imports of Vancouver)
 Araya
 ARES
 Asuka (Nara)
 Azuki (a sub-brand of West Coast Cycle, see Nishiki)
 Baramon (Kurume)
 Bianchi (certain models manufactured in Japan)
 Bridgestone (variously marketed as Anchor, C.Itoh, Kabuki)
 Campania
 CatEye (famous for cycling accessories, manufacture exercise bikes)
 Centurion
 Cherubim (Machida, Tokyo)
 Crafted (Fukui)
 Deki
 Diamond Back
 Elan
 Emme Akko (Miyako)
 Focus (Araya) 
 Fuji
 Fury
 Ganwell (Kyoto)
 Hirose (Kodaira, Tokyo)
 Holks
 Honjo (Tottori)
 Ikesho
 Iribe (Nara)
 Kabuki, see Bridgestone
 Kalavinka (made by Tsukumo, Tokyo)
 Kawamura Cycle, Kobe, Japan (manufactured Nishiki and Azuki brands)
 Kaze and Kaze Race Bicycles 
 Kobe limited, Kobe, Japan
 Kusano Engineering (Tokyo)
 Kuwahara
 Kyoso (Tokyo)
 Level (Tokyo—Established in 1980)
 Lightning (made by Inazuma Cycle)
 Lotus
 Makino Cycle
 Maruishi
 Marukin (White Sails) apparently a subsidiary of Hodaka Corp.
 Mikado
 Miyata
 Kiyo Miyazawa (Tokyo)
 Miyuki (Tokyo)
 Mypallas
 Mizutani (ミズタニ自転車株式会社) (Tokyo) (Established in 1924)
 Nagasawa
 Nakagawa (Osaka)
 Nakamichi
 Nishiki (U.S. brand, earlier as American Eagle, manufactured by Kawamura)
 Noko
 Ono
 Otomo (produced several OEM bikes for different brands) 
 Panasonic / National
 Pegasus (Chofu, Tokyo)
 Peugeot (certain models manufactured in Japan)
 Pie
 Polaris
 Project M (Tsukuba, Ibaraki)
 Puch (certain models manufactured in Japan)
 Raizin (Kiryu, Gunma)
 Raleigh / Rampar (certain models manufactured in Japan)
 Ravanello (made by Takamura, Tokyo)
 Reminton
 Rinsei Lab (Tochigi—Established in 2012)
 Royal Norton
 Royce Union
 San Rensho (3Rensho)
 Sannow
 Schwinn (certain models manufactured in Japan, e.g., Voyageur, World models)
 Sekai
 Sekine
 Shimazaki (Tokyo)
 Shimano 
 Shogun
 Silk
 Skyway
 Smith
 Soma
 SR (Sakae Ringyo), purchased later by Mori Industries, merged with Suntour
 Suntour, purchased later by Mori Industries, merged with SR
 Suteki, a brand marketed by Sears, manufactured by Panasonic.
 Takara
 Tano
 Terry
 Toei (Kawaguchi, Saitama)
 Tokyobike
 Toyo
 Tsunoda (Nagoya, Japan — also manufactured Lotus brand)
 Tubagra
 Univega
 Vigore (Kyoto)
 Vlaams
 Vortex star ( usmans)
 Vogue (made by Orient, Kamakura)
 Zebrakenko
 Zunow (Osaka)

See also

List of bicycle brands and manufacturing companies
List of Australian bicycle brands and manufacturers

References

External links
1984 Centurion Catalog, U.S.

Japanese bicycle brands and manufacturers
Japanese bicycle brands and manufacturers
Japanese bicycle brands and manufacturers